is a Japanese Professor of International Politics at Aoyama Gakuin University in Tokyo. Her research is International Relations, International Politics, International Sociology, Power Shift and National Anxiety, Immigrants-Refugee questions, Nationalism and Xenophobia in the European Union. She wrote a book, Division and Integration in Europe, Nationalism and Border in the Enlarged EU—Inclusion or Exclusion, Chuokoronshinsya, 2016.

She is the Vice President of International Studies Association in the USA(2016–17) which is more than 7,000 members, the President of EUSA Asia Pacific Tokyo Conference in 2017, President of Japanese Association for the Improvement of Conditions of Women Scientists(JAICOWS).  She is Vice Chair of Council on East Asian Community, member of Science Council of Japan, Director of the Institute for Global International Relations, European Institute at Hosei University, and Governing Council member of International Studies Association (2003-5). She is a member of Science Council of Japan, the Directorate member of JPSA (Japanese Political Science Association), JAIR (Japanese Association of International Relations), EUSAJ (European Union Studies Association in Japan), and was the General Secretary of JAREES (Japanese Association for Russian and East European Studies).

She graduated from Tsuda College, was Professor at Hosei University (1985–2007), and Visiting Scholar at Harvard University(2011–12), European University Institute(2007), Sorbonne University (2004), University of London(1996-7), and Hungarian Academy of Science, Institute of History(1995–96).   She was a lecturer at University of Tokyo, Kyoto University, Hitotsubashi University, Waseda University, and Keio University.
She was influenced by Joseph Nye, Eric Hobsbawm, Michael Mann, and Anthony Giddens.
Her analysis is unique enough, analyzing from periphery and borders, investigating Power Shift from Western Modernization to East Asian Collaboration, and Democracy's instability.  She is strongly interesting to make Peace and Reconciliation from Conflicts, and making think-tank networks in instable East Asia.
   
She published 57 books  including co-author and co-writer and more than 160 articles, especially on Asian regionalism, Immigrants and Refugee questions, the European Union-NATO, and Visegrad countries, democratization, nationalism and xenophobia.  University of Sorbonne, European University Institute, and Harvard University.

She got a Jean Monnet Chair from the European Union in 2005. Her recent research is Democracy's instability and Populism, like BREXIT and Trump Presidential election, Power Shift, National and trans-regional cooperation and the role of the United States of America.

Books

57 books, including co-ed and co-writer
 Division and Integration in Europe-Nationalism and Borders of the Enlarged EU, Inclusion or Exclusion, Chuokoron-shinsya, 2016.
 Regional Intebration and Institutionalization comparing Asia and Europe. Ed. by G. John Ikenberry, Yoshinobu Yamamoto, Kumiko Haba, Shoukadou, 2012.
 East Asian Community Thinking from International Politics. Ed. by Yoshinobu Yamamoto, Kumiko Haba & Takashi Oshimura, Minerva Publisher, Kyoto, 2012.
 The Asian Regional　Cooperation in a Global Age, The Relation among the US Japan China and the Trans Pacific Partnership, Iwanami Publisher, Tokyo, 2012.
 The Regional Integration in Asia and Europe, Theoretical and Institutional Comparative Studies and Analysis. Ed. by G. John Ikenberry, Yoshinobu Yamamoto and Kumiko Haba, Aoyama Gakuin University, Tokyo, 2011.
 The End of the Cold War and the Regional Integration in Europe and Asia. Ed. by Robert Frank, Kumiko Haba, and Hiroshi Momose, Aoyama Gakuin University, 2010.
 50 Years Rome Treaty and EU-Asia Relations. Ed. by Chong-ko Peter Tzou, Tamkang University, Taiwan, July 2008.
 Melting Boundaries, Institutional Transformation in the Wider Europe. Kiichiro Yagi and Satoshi Mizobata, eds., Kyoto University Press, 2008.
 Intercultural Dialogue and Citizenship, Translating Values into Actions, A Common Project for Europeans and Their Partners. Ed. by Leonce Bekemans, Antonio Papisca et al.., Marsilio, Venice, 2007.
 Globalization, Regionalization and the History of International Relations. ed. by Joan Beaumont, Alfredo Canavero, Commission of History of International Relations, Edizioni Unicopli, Deakin University, Milano, Victoria, Australia, 2005.
 Russia and NATO: New Areas for Partnership. St. Petersburg State University Press, 2004.
 The Challenge of Enlarged Europe, Does it become a Global Power beside the US?. Chuo Koron co., Tokyo, 2004.
 EU Enlargement towards Central Europe and the Role of Japanese Economy. ed. by　Kumiko Haba, Palankai Tibor, and Hoos Janos, Budapest, Hungary, 2002.
 Globalization and European Enlargement, Emarging Nationalism and Regionalism. Ochanomizu Publishers, Tokyo, 2002.

Translations
 Joseph Rothschild. Return to Diversity. Kyodo, 1999.
 Joseph Rothschild. East Central Europe between Two World Wars. Tosui Publisher, 1996.
 Anthony Polonsky. Little Dictators. Hosei University Puglisher, 1993.
 Minorities in the World. Longmann, Akashi Publisher, 1995.
 Lukacs, Gyorgy. Lukacs and Hungary. Mirai Publisher, 1989.
 Sugar and Lederer. Nationalism in Eastern Europe''. Tosui Publisher, 1981.

Japanese political scientists
Academic staff of Aoyama Gakuin University
Living people
People from Kobe
1952 births
Women political scientists